William A. Dodderer (1901 – December 3, 1990) was a basketball player for the North Carolina Tar Heels, a member of the 1924 national champion team alongside Cart Carmichael and Jack Cobb; he was the center, taking over for Carmichael at that position during the Elon game in 1923-24. He also helped coach. He played on the freshman team in 1921, and sat out of school in 1922.

Dodderer was the resident secretary of the Lumbermen's Mutual Casualty Co.

References

North Carolina Tar Heels men's basketball players
Centers (basketball)
Basketball players from Atlanta
1901 births
1990 deaths